"Friend or Foe" was the title track, and second single from Adam Ant's first solo album. It was released 11 September 1982, exactly one month before the album was released.

Single
Compared to its predecessor, "Goody Two Shoes," (number one on the UK Singles Chart, and number twelve on the Billboard Hot 100 in the US), "Friend or Foe" was received poorly by "Antpeople." It peaked at number 9 on the UK Singles Chart, and was not released as a single in the U.S.

Credits
"Friend or Foe" was written by Adam Ant and Marco Pirroni. The track features Adam on vocals and bass guitar, Marco on guitar, Geoff Daly on saxophone, Martin Drover on trumpet and Bogdan Wiczling on drums. An alternate version with Chris "Merrick" Hughes on drums appears on Antbox. The music video, which received heavy rotation on MTV, was directed by Adam.

Juanito the Bandito
It was fairly common for Ant to record new versions of his pre-1980 compositions for the B-side of his singles. For this single, an old Ant song from 1977 called Juanito the Bandito was used. The song was first recorded as a home demo in Muswell Hill in May 1977.  It was first performed live in January 1978, with one of the earliest renditions being at the widely bootlegged 12 January 1978 concert at the Marquee Club.  The song continued to be performed live sporadically until September 1979 and a full band demo was recorded at Decca Studios in August 1978.  This particular version was recorded in 1982.  The song was subsequently played solo by Ant at a 1987 fan convention and as a duet with Will Crewdson on a 2010 internet radio session.

References

1982 singles
Adam Ant songs
Songs written by Adam Ant
1982 songs
Songs written by Marco Pirroni